Kennedy Meadows refers to a census-designated place (CDP) in Tulare County, California, United States part of the Springville-Johnsondale CCD, and consists of the community surrounding Kennedy Meadows. The CDP is located to the south-east of the Kennedy Meadows Campground. The 2010 United States census reported Kennedy Meadows's population of permanent residents at 28. The census definition of the area may not precisely correspond to local understanding of the area with the same name.

The Kennedy Meadows area is at approximately 6200 feet elevation. The most common access route is by the steep Sherman Pass Road from U.S. Route 395 near Pearsonville. Other routes are possible but much slower. 

Kennedy Meadows sits on the Pacific Crest Trail,  from the trail's southern terminus. The Pacific Crest Trail Data Book uses Kennedy Meadows as the dividing point between the dry Southern California section and the high passes of the Sierra Nevada.

Geography

Demographics

At the 2010 census Kennedy Meadows had a population of 28. The population density was 4.8 people per square mile (1.9/km). The racial makeup of Kennedy Meadows was 25 (89.3%) White, 1 (3.6%) Native American, and 2 (7.1%) from other races.  Hispanic or Latino of any race were 3 people (10.7%).

The whole population lived in households, no one lived in non-institutionalized group quarters and no one was institutionalized.  There were 15 households, 1 (6.7%) had children under the age of 18 living in them, 9 (60.0%) were opposite-sex married couples living together, and 1 (6.7%) had a female householder with no husband present.  There were no unmarried opposite-sex partnerships, and no same-sex married couples or partnerships. 5 households (33.3%) were one person and 3 (20.0%) had someone living alone who was 65 or older. The average household size was 1.87.  There were 10 families (66.7% of households); the average family size was 2.30.

The age distribution was 3 people (10.7%) under the age of 18, 0 people (0%) aged 18 to 24, 0 people (0%) aged 25 to 44, 13 people (46.4%) aged 45 to 64, and 12 people (42.9%) who were 65 or older.  The median age was 61.0 years. For every 100 females, there were 115.4 males.  For every 100 females age 18 and over, there were 108.3 males.

There were 103 housing units at an average density of 17.7 per square mile, of the occupied units 12 (80.0%) were owner-occupied and 3 (20.0%) were rented. The homeowner vacancy rate was 7.7%; the rental vacancy rate was 0%.  20 people (71.4% of the population) lived in owner-occupied housing units and 8 people (28.6%) lived in rental housing units.

References

Census-designated places in Tulare County, California
Census-designated places in California